Parodiophyllochloa is a genus of Latin American plants in the grass family.

The genus name of Parodiophyllochloa is in honour of Lorenzo Raimundo Parodi (1895–1966), an Argentinian botanist and agricultural engineer, professor of botany in Buenos Aires and La Plata with a focus on South American grasses. 

 Species
 Parodiophyllochloa cordovensis - from northern Mexico to northern Argentina
 Parodiophyllochloa missiona - Brazil, Uruguay, Paraguay, northeastern Argentina
 Parodiophyllochloa ovulifera - tropical South America
 Parodiophyllochloa pantricha - tropical South + Central America
 Parodiophyllochloa penicillata - Brazil
 Parodiophyllochloa rhizogona - Brazil, northeastern Argentina

References

Panicoideae
Poaceae genera
Plants described in 2008
Flora of Mexico
Flora of Central America
Flora of northern South America
Flora of western South America
Flora of Brazil
Flora of southern South America